Bershakovo is a rural locality (a selo) and the administrative center of Bershakovskoye Rural Settlement, Shebekinsky District, Belgorod Oblast, Russia. The population was 546 as of 2010. There is 1 street.

Geography 
Bershakovo is located 49 km northeast of Shebekino (the district's administrative centre) by road. Popovka is the nearest rural locality.

References 

Rural localities in Shebekinsky District
Novooskolsky Uyezd